Holmes v. Hurst, 174 U.S. 82 (1899), was a United States Supreme Court case in which the Court held when someone begins printing a serial book in a magazine, they may file for copyright of the entire book even if the book does not exist as a completed whole. Failing that, the book is in the public domain, as expected.

In specific, the Court decided The Autocrat of the Breakfast-Table by Oliver Wendell Holmes Sr. had entered the public domain because of its publication in Atlantic Monthly without copyright notices or an attempt to register a copyright. Its subsequent registration and publication as a whole book by Holmes could not take the individual chapters out of the public domain, so the owner of the book's copyright after Holmes's death could not prevent the publication of those chapters assembled in order as an equivalent book.

The Supreme Court later heard a similar case, Mifflin v. R. H. White Company, about the sequel to The Autocrat.

References

External links
 

1899 in United States case law
United States copyright case law
United States Supreme Court cases
United States Supreme Court cases of the Fuller Court
The Atlantic (magazine)